The Goat Buttes are a group of sandstone outcroppings located along the Backbone Trail in Malibu, California. The area is locally famous for the 'Morrison Cave', a spot which was frequented by Jim Morrison in the 1960s. The Goat Buttes are located in the southwestern corner of Malibu Creek State Park, at the north end of Corral Canyon Road.

References
 

Malibu, California
Sandstone in the United States
Rock formations of California
Landforms of Los Angeles County, California